Clayton Colvin (born 1976) is an American abstract painter, multimedia artist, collagist, and curator of contemporary art who lives and works in Birmingham, Alabama.

Education
Colvin received a BA in Art History from New York University in 1999 and an MA Ed. in Art Education from the University of Alabama at Birmingham in 2003. He received his Master of Fine Arts (MFA) degree in painting from the University of Alabama in Tuscaloosa, AL in 2005. 
 
Colvin interned for Agnes, a photography art gallery in Birmingham, AL for several summers while attending University. As an undergraduate he interned for the Jack Tilton Gallery in New York City, NY.

Art
Colvin is represented by Guido Maus, beta pictoris gallery / Maus Contemporary in Birmingham, AL. His 2013 exhibit at the gallery was reviewed in Art in America by Cinque Hicks. Colvin has exhibited at the launch F18 gallery in New York City, NY  and the Mobile Museum of Art in 2014.
Colvin was included in "Politics, Politics: Nice Artists Explore the Political Landscape" curated by Anne Arrasmith and Peter Prinz of Space One Eleven in Birmingham. Colvin's work was part of "Contour: The Definitive Line" curated by Jon Coffelt. Colvin's work is included in the permanent collection of the Birmingham Museum of Art, the Mobile Museum of Art, and the High Museum of Art

Quotes about Colvin
 "Clayton Colvin's work is an attempt to come to terms with the multitude of experiences we deal with day to day; a way of gaining insight, a way of understanding the present. His work is an effort to order, (re)present and mark his existence". - Brian Bishop (University of Alabama)
"Clayton Colvin's mixed media canvases and sketches are heavily coated with a clear vinyl that has the look of solidified gel. Isolated words are scribbled, sketchy lines and restless black arrows meander across a surface that suggests objects but have no real identity. On occasion, Colvin labels his works as "Untitled" and then gives them titles in parentheses, such as "Metamorphosis," "Space Cadet" and "Ambassador," hinting at content but suggesting is content incidental to intent". - James R. Nelson, critic for The Birmingham News, 2006.
" Fragility and ephemerality are guiding principles in Clayton Colvin's art. Playing with pattern and perception to address these concepts, Colvin creates loose, geometric imagery that combines drawing, painting, and textiles. In fact, Colvin does not distinguish between drawing and painting and purposefully shifts from one to the other in abstract works that fluctuate from formal to expressive. With subtle and playful sense of humor, the artist puts humanity at the center of his work. He explains, "I am interested in feelings, flawed and visceral. I am fragile. I am amazed. I am thankful. It is dirty stuff. It is human. It plays sometimes at control and pixel perfection, and its failure reveals the exact element I want to express.
Merging painted brushstrokes with drawn marks while adding and erasing layers, Colvin finds inspiration in how we consume images, often now mediated through cell phone cameras (...) he deconstructs everyday patterns and digitization found in technology to its base shapes and colors to focus on movement and energy in works that become transcendent. " - Jennifer Jankauskas, Curator of Art, Montgomery Museum of Fine Arts, 2018.

Notes

External links
Clayton Colvin web site
four painters Clayton Colvin - Eugene James Martin - Leslie Smith III - Odili Donald Odita ! a curatorial project at Volta10 Basel, Switzerland
Clayton Colvin's review in Art Forum by Rowan Ricardo Phillips
Clayton Colvin's review in Art of America by Cinque Hicks
Photographic record of a visit to Colvin's studio 
Essay on Colvin Clayton by Brian Bishop
Feature story on Clayton Colvin in The Magazine of Metro Birmingham

Living people
21st-century American painters
Artists from New York (state)
Artists from Louisiana
New York University alumni
Postmodern artists
American art curators
Artists from Birmingham, Alabama
Painters from Alabama
1976 births
American male painters